Private Affairs is a 1925 American silent drama film directed by Renaud Hoffman  with Gladys Hulette, Robert Agnew, and Mildred Harris. The plot was based on a 1922 short story "The Ledger of Life" by George Patullo.

Plot
As described in a film magazine review, Agnes Bomar, daughter of the postmaster of a small town, is admired by Fred Henley, who is bent upon a get-rich scheme. Amy Lufkin is admired by Lee Cross, who goes to work in the oil fields to increase his wealth. The postmaster dies and Agnes retains her position under her father's successor. Fred continues to plan to get rich overnight. Five years pass, and a packet of old letters is found at the post office. One letter tells Amy that Lee wishes her to return to him and marry him. However, Amy is now married to a young merchandiser. However, she now plans to leave her husband and their two babies and go to Lee. Another letter, five years old, tells Andy Gillespie that he has inherited a fortune. There are letters for everyone in town, adding to the turmoil. Into this state rides Lee in loud clothes and a rented automobile. His appearance is so shocking that Amy gives up all thought of returning to him, and presses her children to her bosom. Lee goes to the post office, finds Agnes, and is forcing his attentions on her when Fred appears. A fist fight ensues, and Lee, the loser, retreats in his rented car. Lee is offered a position on the condition that he take Agnes with it, and they both agree.

Cast

Preservation
With no prints of Private Affairs located in any film archives, it is a lost film.

References

External links

1925 films
American silent feature films
Producers Distributing Corporation films
American black-and-white films
Lost American films
Silent American drama films
1925 drama films
1925 lost films
Lost drama films
Films directed by Renaud Hoffman
1920s American films